The European nightcrawler (Dendrobaena hortensis) is a medium-small earthworm averaging about 1.5 g when fully grown.  Generally blueish, pink-grey in color with a banded or striped appearance, the tips of their tails are often cream or pale yellow. When the species has not been feeding, it is pale pink. The species is usually found in deep woodland litter and garden soils that are rich in organic matter in European countries. D. hortensis is sold primarily as a bait worm, but its popularity as a composting worm is increasing.

It was considered part of Eisenia until 2003. It is also formerly considered part of the similar Dendrobaena veneta, but now just part of the species complex. Both are useful compost worms. The two species are probably not distinguished in vermicomposting. In general, the E. hortensis name is more common in North America while the D. veneta name is more common in Europe.

Etymology
The former genus Eisenia is named after Swedish scientist Gustav Eisen. According to the International Code of Zoological Nomenclature, the specific name hortensis ("of the garden") is derived from Latin hortus meaning "garden".

The other specific epithet veneta refers to the Veneto region, a region of northern Italy.

Usage
Compared to Eisenia fetida, D. hortensis does best in an environment with a higher carbon to nitrogen ratio. This makes it well suited to compost pits high in fibrous materials commonly known as browns. European nightcrawlers can be invasive and should be used only in contained compost systems in parts of the world with northern deciduous and boreal forest ecosystems.

Reproduction
D. hortensis, as a hermaphrodite, has both male and female reproductive organs. In mating, the weaker partner is forced into the female role, which is more expensive in terms of biological reproduction costs, for a sperm cell is generally less massive and energy-demanding than an ovum (egg cell), which is the female reproductive cell (gamete) in anisogamous organisms. Two worms join clitella, the large, lighter-colored bands that contain the worms' reproductive organs, and are only prominent during the reproduction process. The two worms exchange sperm. Both worms may secrete cocoons that contain an egg each. These cocoons are lemon-shaped and are pale yellow at first, becoming more brownish as the worms inside become mature. These cocoons are clearly visible to the naked eye.
Statistics 
 From egg to sexual maturity is about 20 weeks.
 Net reproduction of 0.8 eggs per adult per week occurs.
 Egg cells are oviposited in a cocoon.
 One E. hortensis embryo per egg per cocoon occurs.

References

Lumbricidae
Animals described in 1890